Perley Brown Johnson (September 8, 1798 – February 9, 1870) was an American physician and politician who served as a U.S. Representative from Ohio for one term from 1843 to 1845.

Biography 
Born in the blockhouse in Marietta, Ohio, Johnson attended the public schools.
He studied medicine.
He commenced practice in Marietta in 1822.
He moved to McConnelsville Morgan County, Ohio, in 1823 and continued practice.
He served as clerk of the court of common pleas in 1825.
He served as member of the State house of representatives 1833–1835.
Presidential elector in 1840 for Harrison/Tyler.
Johnson was elected as a Whig to the Twenty-eighth Congress (March 4, 1843–March 3, 1845).
He was an unsuccessful candidate for reelection in 1844 to the Twenty-ninth Congress.
He resumed the practice of medicine in McConnelsville, Ohio.
Discontinued the practice of his profession in 1847 on account of ill health and lived in retirement until his death in McConnelsville, Ohio, February 9, 1870.
He was interred in McConnelsville Cemetery.
On December 6, 1825, Johnson married Mary Manchester Dodge. They had five children, four of whom survived him. Perley B. Johnson, Jr. died July 18, 1863, during the charge upon Fort Wagner during the American Civil War.

Sources

1798 births
1870 deaths
Politicians from Marietta, Ohio
People from McConnelsville, Ohio
1840 United States presidential electors
Physicians from Ohio
Members of the Ohio House of Representatives
Whig Party members of the United States House of Representatives from Ohio
19th-century American politicians